Coccothrinax boschiana (guano de Barreras) is a palm endemic to dry forests on limestone on Sierra Martín García ridge and Sierra de Neiba on Barahona peninsula in the south of the Dominican Republic.  This species was first described in 1997.

C. boschiana is palmate-leaved; its leaves have been described as "golden above and silvery below".  Trees grow to about 12 metres in height.

References

External links
 
 
Morici, Carlo. 2002. Coccothrinax boschiana. Palms 41:1.  – URL retrieved June 24, 2006

boschiana
Trees of the Dominican Republic
Plants described in 1997